Matthew Lincoln Miller  (born August 2, 1974) is a former left-handed Major League Baseball pitcher who played for the Detroit Tigers in 2001 and 2002.

Miller attended Monterey High School before attending Texas Tech University, both in Lubbock, Texas. In the 1996 draft, Miller was drafted in the 2nd round by the Detroit Tigers. Miller played collegiately with the Texas Tech Red Raiders baseball team. In 1994 and 1995, he played collegiate summer baseball with the Wareham Gatemen of the Cape Cod Baseball League, and returned to the league in 1996 to play with the Hyannis Mets.

He made his major league debut May 8, 2001 for the Tigers against the Texas Rangers.

References

External links

1974 births
Living people
Major League Baseball pitchers
Baseball players from Texas
Detroit Tigers players
Texas Tech Red Raiders baseball players
Hyannis Harbor Hawks players
Wareham Gatemen players
Sportspeople from Lubbock, Texas